Miami station is a train station in Miami-Dade County, Florida, on the border of Miami and Hialeah. It is the southern terminus for Amtrak's Silver Meteor and Silver Star trains. The station opened in 1978 to replace a 48-year-old Seaboard Air Line Railroad station. It is several blocks away from the Tri-Rail and Metrorail Transfer Station, but there is no direct connection between the two. The station was meant to be replaced in the mid-2010s by the Miami Intermodal Center next to the airport just to the south, but the platforms were too short. A solution is being sought in 2022.

History

When Amtrak took over intercity passenger service in May 1971, it continued to use the former Seaboard Air Line Railroad (SAL) depot at 2210 NW 7th Avenue in Allapattah, two miles north of downtown. The SAL station, built in 1930, soon began to show its age. On May 13, 1977, Amtrak began construction of a new station near the SAL's Hialeah Yards.

Opened on June 20, 1978, the building is one of many built under Amtrak's Standard Stations Program, an attempt to create a unified brand and identity for the company's passenger facilities in its early years. It is considered a Type 300A station, meaning it was designed to accommodate at least 300 passengers at the busiest hour of the day. It is nearly identical to the now closed Midway station in Saint Paul, Minnesota, which was also built in 1978.

A mezzanine houses a lounge and Amtrak regional offices. The $5.7 million station construction project ($ adjusted for inflation) included the fully handicapped accessible station, a 269-car parking lot, and two -long platforms to handle Amtrak's lengthy Florida trains. A loop track runs around the station complex, allowing trains to be turned around for their northbound trips. The last trains arrived at the ex-SAL station on June 19, 1978; the northbound Silver Meteor departed from the new station on June 20 shortly before the ribbon-cutting ceremony.

In the early 1990s, the Florida Department of Transportation began planning an intermodal station to link Tri-Rail, Amtrak, and Metrorail to the Miami International Airport. Metrorail opened to the station in 2012, Tri-Rail commuter trains began serving the new platforms in April 2015, and Amtrak was originally expected to serve this station in 2016, but an error during design resulted in the constructed platforms too short to accommodate the longer trains Amtrak uses during the winter. The original design would have resulted in grade crossings being blocked by the last cars of these longer trains. After changes to traffic patterns around the station, Amtrak was initially expected to move to Miami Airport Station in late 2018. By late 2018, the move had been postponed indefinitely.

In 2021, Amtrak reached out to FDOT to begin negotiations again for utilization of the Miami Intermodal Center. Test train operations began in February 2022 with further negotiation meetings expected in 2022.

Station layout
The station has three tracks with two low-level platforms. The station building is located south of Track 1 and directly adjacent to the eastern platform

References

External links

USA Rail Guide - Miami
Miami station on Google Maps Street View

Amtrak stations in Florida
Hialeah, Florida
Railway stations in the United States opened in 1978
1978 establishments in Florida
Transportation buildings and structures in Miami-Dade County, Florida